Daniel Enrique González Orellana (born February 20, 2002) is a Chilean footballer who currently plays as a defender for Chilean club Universidad Católica.

Club career
He made his professional debut playing for Santiago Wanderers in a 2019 Primera B match against Deportes Melipilla on May 4, 2019. Along with Santiago Wanderers, he got promotion to Primera División after winning 2019 Primera B.

International career
He represented Chile U15 at the 2017 South American U-15 Championship, playing all the matches, and Chile U17 at the 2019 South American U-17 Championship – Chile was the runner-up – and at the 2019 FIFA U-17 World Cup.

Later, he was a substitute for Chile U23 in a friendly match against Brazil U23 on September 9, 2019, and called up to the first training microcycle of the Chile senior team on 2021. 

On March 26, 2021 he made his debut for the Chile senior team in a friendly match against Bolivia playing as a right-back.

He represented Chile at under-23 level in a 1–0 win against Peru U23 on 31 August 2022, in the context of preparations for the 2023 Pan American Games.

Career statistics

Club

Honours

Club
Santiago Wanderers
 Primera B (1): 2019

References

External links
 

Living people
2002 births
People from Arica
Chilean footballers
Chile youth international footballers
Chile international footballers
Chilean Primera División players
Primera B de Chile players
Santiago Wanderers footballers
Club Deportivo Universidad Católica footballers
Association football defenders
2021 Copa América players
21st-century Chilean people